The Comfort News was founded in 1904 in Comfort, Texas as a weekly. Originally founded by Vincent McAteer, it was sold to Emma D'Albini Belsey and her husband George in 1925, with Emma taking over as publisher and editor, making her one of the early female editors of a Texas newspaper. As the Kerrville Times exclaimed in 1933: "Who said that a woman could not edit an interesting, up-to-the-minute newspaper!"

Emma Belsey sold her financial interest in the paper to her son, George Belsey, in 1953, but remained connected with the publication until the early 1960s. It was sold to Reed Harp in 1968, who subsequently sold it to Bob Barton, Jr. and Don Trepaignier in 1972.

It currently has a circulation of about 1,000.

References

External links

Weekly newspapers published in Texas
Publications established in 1904
1904 establishments in Texas
Kendall County, Texas